Jamaica competed at the 2018 Winter Olympics in Pyeongchang, South Korea, from 9 to 25 February 2018, with three competitors in two sports.

Competitors
The following is the list of number of competitors participating at the Games per sport/discipline.

Bobsleigh

Jamaica qualified a women's bobsled of two athletes. This will mark the first time the country has entered women into the bobsleigh competition. In the days leading up to the event the team's participation was in doubt after their German coach Sandra Kiriasis quit after refusing to change her role from driving coach to performance analyst. Kiriasis claimed ownership of the team's sled and insisted on payment from the Jamaica Bobsleigh Federation which was refused.

* – Denotes the driver of each sled

Skeleton

See also
Jamaica at the 2018 Summer Youth Olympics
Jamaica at the 2018 Commonwealth Games

References

Nations at the 2018 Winter Olympics
2018
Winter Olympics